Antwerp station is a historic former train station in the village of Antwerp in the far western portion of the U.S. state of Ohio.  Built in 1880 by the Wabash, St. Louis and Pacific Railway, it is a primarily wooden structure with weatherboarded walls.  Its roof features a distinctively large overhang.

When the depot was built, Antwerp was the largest community in Paulding County, due to an active logging industry.  Accordingly, the depot was built to be larger than most train stations in small northwestern Ohio communities.  Inside, the station is divided into several distinct areas: freight, ordinary passengers, mail and express packaging, and internal railroad offices; each possess their own rooms.  Other than its size, the depot is typical of late nineteenth-century train stations in northwestern Ohio, which frequently served as commercial hubs for their communities.

Four years later, the depot was listed on the National Register of Historic Places as the Antwerp Norfolk and Western Depot, both because of its distinctive architecture and because of its significance in local history. This designation is unusual, for buildings that have been moved from their original locations are not normally eligible for inclusion on the National Register.

References

National Register of Historic Places in Paulding County, Ohio
Railway stations in the United States opened in 1880
Railway stations closed in 1976
Former Wabash Railroad stations
Buildings and structures in Paulding County, Ohio
Railway stations on the National Register of Historic Places in Ohio
Relocated buildings and structures in Ohio
Former railway stations in Ohio